The following is a timeline of the history of the city of Columbus, Ohio, United States.

18th century
 1797: Lucas Sullivant founds Franklinton, Central Ohio's first permanent white settlement and the oldest Columbus neighborhood.

19th century
 1803
 Ohio becomes the first state formed from the Northwest Territory.
 Franklin County is formed from Ross County.
 1805: Postal service is established in Franklinton, and the settlement acquires its first preacher.
 1806: The first schoolhouse is built, a 16-foot-square log building.
 1811: The first church is constructed, by the present-day Old Franklinton Cemetery.
 1812
 Columbus is founded.
 Population: 300.
 Foundations for High Street laid out.
 1813: Columbus's first post office is established.
 1814
 William Ludlow is named "director of the town of Columbus" to supervise its construction.
 The first market house, later known as Central Market, is constructed.
 The first newspaper is established, The Western Intelligencer, after it moves from Worthington.
 1816 
 Columbus becomes the capitol of Ohio and the legislature meets in Columbus's first statehouse.
 The Village of Columbus is organized, with Jarvis W. Pike elected as the first mayor.
 1817
 James Monroe visits Columbus, the first U.S. President to do so.
 The Ohio State Library is headquartered in Columbus.
 1824: The seat of Franklin County moves from Franklinton to Columbus.
 1826: The first public schools are opened in Columbus and Franklinton.
 1832: The Ohio School for the Deaf is established.
 1831: Columbus is connected to the Ohio and Erie Canal through the Columbus Feeder Canal.
 1833
 National Road in operation.
 A cholera epidemic kills 100 residents and causes 1,000 to move away.
 1834
 Columbus chartered as a city, population: 3,500.
 John Brooks becomes mayor.
 Ohio Penitentiary begins operating.
 1837: Ohio State School for the Blind established.
 1840: Population: 6,048.
 1845: Columbus Public Schools established.
 1849 
 State Convention of the Colored Citizen held in city.
 Green Lawn Cemetery established.
 1850
 The Columbus and Xenia Railroad begins operating, and the first passenger train arrives in the city.
 Development of Franklin Park began.
 Population: 17,882.
 1851
 Cleveland, Columbus and Cincinnati Railroad begins operating.
 Union Station operates from 1851 to 1977.
 1853
 Saint Patrick Church founded.
 Columbus Athenaeum founded.
 1857: The Ohio Statehouse opens to the public and begins use.
 1861
 Ohio Statehouse fully completed.
 Camp Chase is established (1861).
 1862: Fort Hayes is established.
 1865: Abraham Lincoln's funeral procession stops in Columbus.
 1868
 St. Mary's of the Springs school opens.
 Cleveland, Columbus, Cincinnati and Indianapolis Railway in operation.
 1870 
 Columbus annexes , including Franklinton.
 The Ohio State University is founded, as the Ohio Agricultural and Mechanical College.
 Columbus Circulating Library organized.
 1871
 The Daily Dispatch newspaper begins publication.
 Public water system first set-up.
 Population: 32,000.
 1872: Public Library & Reading Room established at Columbus City Hall.
 1873: The Ohio Agricultural and Mechanical College opens.
 1874: The Ohio State Fair is permanently established in Columbus, after being held in cities throughout the state each year.
 1875: Union Station rebuilt.
 1878
 St. Joseph Cathedral building completed.
 Columbus Gallery of Fine Arts and Ohio State University Marching Band established.
 1879: Columbus Art School and Camp Chase Confederate Cemetery established.
 1880: Population: 51,647.
 1887: Franklin County Courthouse built.
 1890: Population: 88,150.
 1894: "Ugly law" approved.
 1895: Franklin Park Conservatory opens.
 1898: First Neighborhood Guild organized.
 1899
 Columbus Citizen newspaper begins publication.
 Masonic Temple built.
 Hocking Valley Railway operates from 1899 to 1930.
 1900
 Godman Guild House built.
 Population: 125,560.

20th century
 1903: Columbus, Delaware and Marion Railway operated 1903 to 1933.
 1904: Governor's Mansion and Franklin County Memorial Hall built.
 1905: Indianola Park (amusement park) in business.
 1906: Columbus Public Library building constructed.
 1910
 Streetcar strike.
 Population: 181,511.
 1913: The Great Flood of 1913
 1912: Woman Suffrage parade takes place.
 1914: The Columbus City Charter is adopted.
 1917: Women are granted the right to vote in municipal elections.
 1919: The Spring Street YMCA opens.
 1920
Planning begins for buildings in the Columbus Civic Center.
Population: 237,031.
 1922: Ohio State University's Ohio Stadium built.
 1924: Central High School is completed, the first building completed in the new Columbus Civic Center.
 1927: The American Insurance Union Citadel is completed, becoming the fifth-tallest building in the world at the time.
 1928
 Columbus City Hall is completed, replacing the Old City Hall destroyed by fire in 1921.
 Ohio Theatre opens.
 1929
The present-day John Glenn Columbus International Airport is established.
Battelle Memorial Institute founded.
 1933: Ohio State Office Building constructed.
 1934: U.S. Post Office and Courthouse built.
 1936: White Castle restaurant chain headquartered in city.
 1937: Spanish–American War Memorial dedicated.
 1940: Population: 306,087.
 1947: National Auto Theatre (drive-in cinema) in business.
 1952: Ohio State University's Mershon Center for International Security Studies established.
 1954: Black Baptist Pastors' Conference organized (approximate date).
 1955
 Franklin Heights High School founded.
 Columbus begins planning its interstate highways along with state and federal agencies.
 Sister city relationship established with Genoa, Italy.
 1959: The Columbus Citizen-Journal newspaper in publication.
 1960: Population: 471,316.
 1964
 Northland Mall in business.
 Bank One Tower built.
 1969: First Wendy's founded by Dave Thomas.
 1970
Columbus Free Press begins publication.
 Columbus surpasses Cincinnati in population. 
 1974: Rhodes State Office Tower built.
 1975: Columbus Monthly magazine begins publication.
 1976
 Fort Hayes Metropolitan Education Center established.
 Union Station demolished.
 1977
 QUBE television begins broadcasting.
 One Nationwide Plaza built.
 Clippers begin playing in Columbus.
 1978: Community Development Task Force formed.
 1980: Sister city relationship established with Tainan City, Taiwan.
 1982: Columbus surpasses Cleveland to become the largest city by population in Ohio.
 1984
 Huntington Center built.
 Ohio Penitentiary closes.
 1985: Catco theatre company founded.
 1987
 King Arts Complex active.
 Union Station mural painted.
 1988
 Vern Riffe State Office Tower and Three Nationwide Plaza built.
 Sister city relationships established with Hefei, China; Odense, Denmark; and Seville, Spain.
 1989: Columbus City Center (shopping mall) in business.
 1990
 The Other Paper begins publication.
 William Green Building constructed.
 Population: 632,910.
 1991
 City government computer network begins operating.
 Carriage Place Movies 12 (cinema) in business.
 1992: Sister city relationship established with Dresden, Germany.
 1996
 Columbus Crew begins play with the newly established Major League Soccer.
 Sister city relationship established with Herzliya, Israel.
 Chamber of Commerce city portal online.
 1998: City government website online (approximate date).
 1999
 The Columbus Crew moves to newly-built Columbus Crew Stadium.
 Easton Town Center opens.
 Columbus Ohio Temple built.
 2000
 Michael B. Coleman begins his first term as mayor of Columbus.
 Nationwide Arena opens, hosting the newly founded Columbus Blue Jackets.
 Population: 711,470.

21st century
 2001
 Columbus Underground begins publication.
 Miranova Condominiums built.
 Arena Grand cinema and Polaris Fashion Place (shopping mall) in business.
 2004: The Northland Mall on Morse Road, which closed in 2002, is demolished to make way for a new commercial development, ultimately to be called Northland Village.
 2008: Sister city relationship established with Ahmedabad, India.
 2009: Huntington Park opens in the Arena District, replacing Cooper Stadium as the home of Columbus Clippers baseball.
 2010 
 Population: 787,033.
 Columbus City Center demolished.
 2011
 Columbus Commons opens.
 Steve Stivers becomes U.S. representative for Ohio's 15th congressional district.
 2013
 Population: 822,553.
 Joyce Beatty becomes U.S. representative for Ohio's 3rd congressional district.
 2014: Sister city relationship established with Curitiba, Brazil.
 2016
 Columbus surpasses Indianapolis to become the second largest city in the Midwest.
 Andrew Ginther begins his first term as mayor.
 2018: Columbus surpasses San Francisco to become the 14th-largest city in America.
 2020
 The COVID-19 pandemic is introduced to Columbus.
 George Floyd protests take place in Columbus and most major U.S. cities.
Population 905,748.
 2021: Lower.com Field, the new Columbus Crew stadium, opens.

See also
 History of Columbus, Ohio
 List of mayors of Columbus, Ohio

Other cities in Ohio
 Timeline of Cincinnati
 Timeline of Cleveland
 Timeline of Toledo, Ohio

References

Bibliography

Published in 19th century 
1840s-1860s
 
 Columbus Directory. John R. Armstrong, 1843.
 
 Columbus Directory. Glover and Henderson, 1855.
  c. 1864- .
   c. 1867- .1883 ed.
1870s-1890s
  c. 1871- . 1873 ed., 1877 ed.
  c. 1872- .
 
  c. 1879- .
 Columbus Directory. J. Wiggins & Co., 1884–1888.

Published in 20th century
  c. 1901- .
 
  part 2, part 3
 
 
 
 Henry L. Hunker, Industrial Evolution of Columbus, Ohio (Columbus: Bureau of Business Research, College of Commerce and Administration, Ohio State University, 1958)
 
 Columbus, America's Crossroads. Betty Garrett and Edward R. Lentz. Tulsa: Continental Heritage Press, 1980.

Published in 21st century
 
 
  (series of articles about Columbus, OH), 2014-

External links

 Columbus Metropolitan Library. Local History
 
 Digital Public Library of America. Items related to Columbus, Ohio, various dates

Years in Ohio
Columbus
 
Columbus, Ohio